A Black & White Night Live is a Roy Orbison music album made posthumously by Virgin Records from the HBO television special, Roy Orbison and Friends: A Black and White Night, which was filmed in 1987 and broadcast in 1988. According to the authorised Roy Orbison biography, the album was released in October 1989 and included the song "Blue Bayou" which because of time constraints had been deleted from the televised broadcast. However it did not include the song "Claudette" and "Blue Angel" which were also cut from the original broadcast for the same reason. The SACD/CD Hybrid Audio Disc includes "Blue Angel" as a bonus track - the SACD/CD Hybrid Disc is contained in a pack with the DVD released by Image Entertainment, USA (ID27700BDVD). "Claudette" was included in later releases of the concert. According to the authorised biography, all tracks are now released on the 30 year anniversary "Black & White Night 30."

On piano was Glen D. Hardin, who had played piano for Buddy Holly as well as Elvis Presley. Lead guitarist James Burton, drummer Ronnie Tutt and bassist Jerry Scheff were also from Presley's group. Male background vocals and some guitars were provided by Bruce Springsteen, Tom Waits, Elvis Costello, Jackson Browne, J.D. Souther and Steven Soles. Female background vocalists were k.d. lang, Jennifer Warnes and Bonnie Raitt.

All the stars weren't on stage. You can catch quick glimpses of celebrities in the audience including Kris Kristofferson, Patrick Swayze, Billie Idol and Sandra Bernhard.

On February 24, 2017, a 30th anniversary edition, titled Black & White Night 30, was released. The edition has been expanded, re-edited to include new footage and original running order to set list, and remastered. It is available both as a CD/DVD and a CD/Blu-ray set. This release has sold 161,400 copies as of March 2017.

Critical reception

Bruce Eder of AllMusic writes, "The best-recorded Roy Orbison live disc ever issued, taken from the soundtrack of the HBO concert from the 1980s with VIP guests like Bruce Springsteen and Elvis Costello. This was a sort of magical video, and the performances are splendid, along with the good feelings involved."

Grant Britt of American Songwriter also thinks this album rates 4 out of 5 stars and calls Black and White Night, "one of the best rock shows ever filmed."

No Depression'''s review, also by Grant Britt, begins with, "The voice grabs you and won't let go. It’s impossible to duplicate, a soaring, ethereal instrument that swoops and dips with a range few humans ever get within earshot of. Roy Orbison was a musical God, his songwriting skills just as awe-inspiring as his vocal abilities. His legacy endures with a wealth of recorded material, but nothing eclipses 1987’s Black and White Night"

Ryan Reed writes for Rolling Stone, "In a backstage interview, Costello called Orbison "the greatest," explaining how he learned about the singer's music second-hand through the Beatles."

Gary Graff reviews the album for Billboard and writes, "The Black & White Night'' show was a pivotal event during Roy Orbison's late '80s comeback. Preceding his involvement with the all-star Traveling Wilburys band (Orbison, George Harrison, Bob Dylan, Tom Petty and Jeff Lynne), the show put a spotlight on Orbison's classic hits with help from Elvis Presley's TCB Band and guests Bruce Springsteen, Elvis Costello, Bonnie Raitt, k.d. Lang, Tom Waits, Jackson Browne, J.D. Souther and Steven Soles."

Track listing

Personnel
Roy Orbison - lead vocals, electric rhythm guitar, electric lead guitar on "Ooby Dooby" and "Go, Go, Go (Down the Line)," harmonica on "Candy Man"
Glen D. Hardin - piano
James Burton - electric and acoustic lead guitars, electric and acoustic rhythm guitars
Jerry Scheff - upright bass
Ronnie Tutt - drums
Alex Acuña - percussion
Jackson Browne - backing vocals
T-Bone Burnett - acoustic guitar
Elvis Costello - Acoustic Guitar, Electric Organ, Harmonica, Backing Vocals
k.d. lang - backing vocals
Bonnie Raitt - backing vocals
Steven Soles - backing vocals
J.D. Souther - backing vocals, harmony vocals, acoustic guitar
Bruce Springsteen - rhythm and lead electric guitar, harmony vocals, backing vocals
Michael Utley - electric organ
Tom Waits - electric organ, acoustic guitar
Jennifer Warnes - backing vocals

Charts

Certifications

References

Roy Orbison albums
Albums produced by T Bone Burnett
Live albums published posthumously
1989 live albums
Virgin Records live albums